Peter Alexis Shukoff (born August 15, 1979), best known as his stage name Nice Peter or Bluesocks, is an American musician and Internet personality. A self-described "Comic/Guitar Hero", he is best known for the comedy on his YouTube channel, NicePeter, and especially for the comedic series Epic Rap Battles of History  which he co-created with Lloyd Ahlquist ("EpicLLOYD") . As of June 8, 2016, NicePeter has over 2.6 million YouTube subscribers. The day after hitting one million subscribers, the video game channel G4 crowned Nice Peter the King of Dot Comedy on Attack of the Show. His two channels, Nice Peter and Epic Rap Battles (ERB), have a total of over 17 million subscribers and 4 billion views as of February 2019. He also has a third channel that he uses for vlogs and "Monday Shows", a show that he uploads on either Mondays or Tuesdays consisting of different segments including "Viewer Mail", "Twitter Question Time", and "Ask a Giraffe". They have been featured on the Huffington Post, Billboard.com, Forbes and the January 2012 issue of Wired.

Life and career
Shukoff was born in Rochester, New York to a Russian father and an American mother. He has 2 sisters. As a child, Shukoff would often Irish dance for his class. Shukoff graduated from the School of the Arts in 1997 and attended Fredonia State University, where he majored in education and history. He originally planned on becoming a history teacher, but the plan did not work out. He later became a birthday party magician. Shukoff learned to play guitar before he had finished school, but spent a time pursuing a comedic career. Once settled in Chicago, he began playing live in bars and comedy clubs in the area, where he met Lloyd Ahlquist, his future partner.

Shukoff has explained that although he was initially more active on social media, his social media usage decreased as he felt it was artificial. He explains that his baldness helped him realize this.

Career

Epic Rap Battles of History is a comedic music video series created by Peter Shukoff and Lloyd Ahlquist. Ahlquist and Shukoff met at a house party in Chicago organized by an improv group that Ahlquist was a part of. The series features historical and popular fictional and real-life figures battling each other through the medium of rap. Battles have included "Darth Vader vs. Adolf Hitler", "Abraham Lincoln vs. Chuck Norris", and "Miley Cyrus vs. Joan of Arc". Some episodes use characters that are fictional, whether it be television or movie characters, as seen in "Rick Grimes vs. Walter White". Others use comic book characters, as seen in "Goku vs. Superman". Episodes typically consist of Nice Peter and EpicLLOYD rapping against each other in character, but sometimes feature guest stars in addition to or replacing Shukoff and Ahlquist. Occasionally, the pair appear in non-speaking background roles, as in the episodes "Cleopatra vs. Marilyn Monroe", "Gandhi vs. Martin Luther King Jr.", "Miley Cyrus vs. Joan of Arc", and "Michael Jordan vs. Muhammad Ali". Shukoff and Ahlquist also contributed a rap battle to the film The SpongeBob Movie: Sponge Out of Water and performed it with Matt Berry. Shukoff also made a cameo appearance as a surfer dude in the film. He also did additional voices for film The Mitchells vs. The Machines.

Personal life
Shukoff announced that he had married in 2018. He has 2 children, a daughter born in 2018 and a son born in 2020. They live in Culver City, California.

Awards and nominations

Discography

B-Sides for Kate 
 All I Got (the Christmas Song)	
 I'm Just a Man
 High With Pauly
 My Favorite Bar	
 Chuck Norris	
 Spanglish (unreleased full band recording)	
 Sarah Palin

Live in Preston 
 Intro	
 Smoke That Weed	
 Daniel the Boyfriend
 Knickers
 The Redwings
 50 Cent is a Pussy
 F$%k London
 Spanglish
 Cover Bands
 Tru Gangster
 Chavs
 If You Really Love Me
 White Trash Woman
 My Right Hand
 The Bush Song
 Mystery of the Clitoris
 I Quit, You Fat Mother F$%cker

Songs about people 
 I Fell Asleep on her Boobs
 Bald Guy
 Cell Phones
 Put Your Coat On
 Cover Bands
 Jennifer
 Porn Star
 Friends
 Hard To Stay
 Radical Muslim Penpal
 Sugar Momma
 The Masterpiece Part II (bonus)
 Superman Socks

Songs For Moms 
 The Bush Song
 Spanglish
 Tru Gangster
 I Quit, You Fat Mother F$%cker
 My Right Hand
 If You Really Love Me
 Old and Fat Together
 Popsi
 Make Up Sex
 Smoke That Weed

Suburban Highschool 
 White Trash Woman
 Suburban Highschool
 F**k Guitar Center	
 Snufulupugus
 50 Cent is a Pussy
 You Shouldn't Have Pissed Me Off
 STD Test
 It's Time to be Gay
 The Masterpiece
 Mystery of the C**t
 Dude, I'm So High

Filmography

References

External links 

 Nice Peter on YouTube
 Nice Peter on Twitter
 Nice Peter on Facebook

Nice Peter
Nice Peter
Nice Peter
Nice Peter
Nice Peter
Nice Peter
Nice Peter
Nice Peter
Nice Peter
Nice Peter
Nice Peter
Nice Peter
Nice Peter
Nice Peter
Nice Peter
Nice Peter